The Vanderyst worm lizard (Monopeltis vanderysti), also known commonly as Vanderyst's worm lizard, is a species of amphisbaenian in the family Amphisbaenidae. The species is native to Central Africa. There are two recognized subspecies.

Etymology
The specific name, vanderysti, is in honor of Father Hyacinth Julien Robert Vanderyst (1860–1934), who was a missionary and naturalist in the Belgian Congo.

Geographic range
M. vanderysti is found in Angola, and the Democratic Republic of the Congo.

Habitat
The preferred natural habitat of M. vanderysti is savanna, but it has also been found in agricultural plantations.

Behavior
M. vanderysti is terrestrial and fossorial.

Subspecies
Two subspecies are recognized as being valid, including the nominotypical subspecies.
Monopeltis vanderysti lujae 
Monopeltis vanderysti vanderysti

Reproduction
The mode of reproduction of M. vanderysti is unknown.

References

Further reading
Broadley DG, Gans C, Visser J (1976). "Studies on Amphisbaenians (Amphisbaenia, Reptilia). 6. The Genera Monopeltis and Dalophia in Southern Africa ". Bulletin of the American Museum of Natural History 157: 311–486. (Monopeltis vanderysti, pp. 431–437, Figures 98–102).
de Witte G-F (1922). "Description de reptiles nouveaux du Congo Belge". Revue de Zoologie Africaine 10 (2): 66–71 + Plates I–II. (Monopeltis vanderysti, new species, pp. 66–67 + Plate I, figures 1, 1A, 1B, 1C; M. lujae, new species, pp. 67–68 + Plate I, figures 2, 2A, 2B, 2C). (in French).
Gans C (2005). "Checklist and Bibliography of the Amphisbaenia of the World". Bull. American Mus. Nat. Hist. (289): 1–130. (Monopeltis vanderysti, p. 37).

Monopeltis
Reptiles of the Democratic Republic of the Congo
Reptiles of Angola
Reptiles described in 1922
Taxa named by Gaston-François de Witte